Tianyang District () is a district in western Guangxi, China. It is under the administration of the prefecture-level city of Baise.

History
Tianyang County was formed in 1935 by combining Fengyi County and Enyang County with the county seat in Napo and in 1954 the county seat was moved to Tianzhou. In 1935 the population was 135,071.

In August 2019, the county was converted into a district.

Administrative divisions 
From June 21, 2005, there are 7 towns and 3 townships in the county:

Towns:
Tianzhou (田州镇)(63k)
Napo (那坡镇)(32k)
Pohong (坡洪镇)(37k)
Naman (那满镇)(23k)
Baiyu (百育镇)(27k)
Yufeng (玉凤镇)(38k)
Toutang (头塘镇)(24k)

Townships:
Dongjing Township (洞靖乡)(32k)
Babie Township (巴别乡)(20k)
Wucun Township (五村乡)(27k)(98% Zhuang)

Demographics
Tianyang's population was 338,300 in 2010. 90.2% of the people belong to the Zhuang ethnic group, and speak Youjiang Zhuang. The rest include Han, Yao, Miao, and other ethnic groups.

Climate

Culture and Arts
In Tianyang, there are many traditional types of singing, not just folk songs, but also Cantonese opera, Colourful Opera, Zhuang opera, and "Tang Emperor" style.

Transportation
Apart from road access including the G80 Guangzhou–Kunming Expressway, the district also has rail access via Tianyang Railway Station which is part of the Nanning–Kunming high-speed railway network and air access via Baise Bama Airport.

References

External links 

Counties and cities in Baise